The men's 89 kilograms competition at the 2022 World Weightlifting Championships was held on 10 and 11 December 2022.

Schedule

Medalists

Records

Results

References

Men's 89 kg